Convict leasing was a system of forced penal labor which was practiced historically in the Southern United States, the laborers being mainly African-American men; it was ended during the 20th century. (Convict labor in general continues; for example  voluntary labor from the general prison population has been used more recently in some parts of the Western United States). It provided prisoner labor to private parties, such as plantation owners and corporations (e.g. Tennessee Coal and Iron Company and Chattahoochee Brick Company). The lessee was responsible for feeding, clothing, and housing the prisoners.

The state of Louisiana leased out convicts as early as 1844, but the system expanded throughout most of the South with the emancipation of slaves at the end of the American Civil War in 1865.  It could be lucrative for the states: in 1898, some 73% of Alabama's entire annual state revenue came from convict leasing.

While states of the Northern United States sometimes contracted for prison labor, the historian Alex Lichtenstein notes that "only in the South did the state entirely give up its control to the contractor; and only in the South did the physical "penitentiary" become virtually synonymous with the various private enterprises in which convicts labored".

Corruption, lack of accountability, and violence resulted in "one of the harshest and most exploitative labor systems known in American history".  African Americans, mostly adult males, due to "vigorous and selective enforcement of laws and discriminatory sentencing", comprised the vast majority—though not all—of the convicts leased.

The writer Douglas A. Blackmon described the system: "It was a form of bondage distinctly different from that of the antebellum South in that for most men, and the relatively few women drawn in, this slavery did not last a lifetime and did not automatically extend from one generation to the next.  But it was nonetheless slavery – a system in which armies of free men, guilty of no crimes and entitled by law to freedom, were compelled to labor without compensation, were repeatedly bought and sold, and were forced to do the bidding of white masters through the regular application of extraordinary physical coercion".

U.S. Steel is among the American companies who have acknowledged using African-American leased convict labor.  The practice peaked about 1880, was formally outlawed by the last state (Alabama) in 1928, and persisted in various forms until it was abolished by President Franklin D. Roosevelt via Francis Biddle's "Circular 3591" of December 12, 1941.

Origins
Convict leasing in the United States was widespread in the South during the Reconstruction Period (1865–1877) after the end of the Civil War, when many Southern legislatures were ruled by majority coalitions of blacks and Radical Republicans, and Union generals acted as military governors. Farmers and businessmen needed to find replacements for the labor force once their slaves had been freed. Some Southern legislatures passed Black Codes to restrict free movement of blacks and force them into employment. For instance, several states made it illegal for a black man to change jobs without the approval of his employer. If convicted of vagrancy, blacks could be imprisoned, and they also received sentences for a variety of petty offenses. States began to lease convict labor to the plantations and other facilities seeking labor, as the freed men were trying to withdraw and work for themselves. This provided the states with a new source of revenue during years when their finances were largely depleted, and lessees profited by the use of forced labor at less than market rates.

The criminal justice system allegedly colluded with private planters and other business owners to entrap, convict, and lease blacks as prison laborers. The constitutional basis for convict leasing is that the 1865 Thirteenth Amendment, while abolishing slavery and involuntary servitude generally, permits it as a punishment for crime.

The criminologist Thorsten Sellin, in his book Slavery and the Penal System (1976), wrote that the sole purpose of convict leasing "was financial profit to the lessees who exploited the labor of the prisoners to the fullest, and to the government which sold the convicts to the lessees". The practice became widespread and was used to supply labor to farming, railroad, mining, and logging operations throughout the South.

The system in various states
In Georgia convict leasing began in April 1868, when Union General and newly appointed provisional governor Thomas H. Ruger issued a convict lease for prisoners to William Fort for work on the Georgia and Alabama Railroad.  The contract specified "one hundred able bodied and healthy Negro convicts" in return for a fee to the state of $2500.  In May the state entered into a second agreement with Fort and his business partner Joseph Printup for another 100 convicts, this time for $1000, to work on the Selma, Rome and Dalton Railroad, also in north Georgia. Georgia ended the convict lease system in 1908.

In Tennessee, the convict leasing system was ended on January 1, 1894 because of the attention brought by the "Coal Creek War" of 1891, an armed labor action lasting more than a year. At the time both free and convict labor were used in mines, although the two types of workers were kept separated. Free coal miners attacked and burned prison stockades, and freed hundreds of black convicts; the related publicity and outrage turned Governor John P. Buchanan out of office.

The end of convict leasing did not mean the end of convict labor, however. The state sited its new penitentiary, Brushy Mountain State Penitentiary, with the help of geologists. The prison built a working coal mine on the site, dependent on labor done by prisoners, and operated it at significant profit.  These prison mines were closed in 1966.

Texas began convict leasing by 1883 and abolished it officially in 1910. A cemetery containing what are believed to be the remains of 95 "slave convicts" has recently (2018) been discovered in Sugar Land, now a suburb of Houston.

Alabama began convict leasing in 1846 and outlawed it in 1928. It was the last state to formally outlaw it. The revenues derived from convict leasing were substantial, accounting for about 10% of total state revenues during 1883, surging to nearly 73% by 1898. Political campaigning against convict leasing in Alabama began in 1915. Bibb Graves, who became Alabama's governor in 1927, had promised during his election campaign to abolish convict leasing as soon as he was inaugurated, and this was finally achieved by the end of June 1928.

This lucrative practice created incentives for states and counties to convict African Americans, and helped increase the prison population in the South to become predominantly African-American after the Civil War. In Tennessee, African Americans represented 33 percent of the population at the main prison in Nashville as of October 1, 1865, but by November 29, 1867, their percentage had increased to 58.3. By 1869, it had increased to 64 percent, and it reached an all-time high of 67 percent between 1877 and 1879.

Prison populations also increased overall in the South. In Georgia prison populations increased tenfold during the four-decade period (1868–1908) when it used convict leasing; in North Carolina the prison population increased from 121 in 1870 to 1,302 in 1890; in Florida the population increased from 125 in 1881 to 1,071 in 1904; in Mississippi the population quadrupled between 1871 and 1879; in Alabama it increased from 374 in 1869 to 1,878 in 1903; and to 2,453 in 1919.

In Florida, convicts, who were often African American, were sent to work in turpentine factories and lumber camps. The convict labor system in Florida was described as being "severe", compared to other states. Florida was one of the last states to end convict leasing, in 1923 (see Union Correctional Institution).

End of the system
Although opposition to the system increased during the beginning of the 20th century, state politicians resisted its elimination. In states where the convict lease system was used, revenues from the program generated income nearly four times the cost (372%) of prison administration.  The practice was extremely profitable for the governments, as well as for those business-owners who used convict labor. However, other problems accompanied convict leasing, and employers became gradually more aware of the disadvantages.

While some believe the demise of the system can be attributed to exposure of the inhumane treatment suffered by the convicts, others indicate causes ranging from comprehensive legislative reforms to political retribution. Though the convict lease system, as such, disappeared, other types of convict labor continued (and still exist presently). These other systems include plantations, industrial prisons, and chain gangs.

The convict lease system was gradually phased out during the early 20th century due to negative publicity and other factors. A notable case of negative publicity for the system was the case of Martin Tabert, a young white man from Munich, North Dakota. Arrested in late 1921 in Tallahassee, Florida on a charge of vagrancy for being on a train without a ticket, Tabert was convicted and fined $25. Although his parents sent $25 for the fine, plus $25 for Tabert to return home to North Dakota, the money disappeared while Tabert was held in the Leon County Jail. There, he was flogged to death by the whipping boss, Thomas Walter Higginbotham. Coverage of Tabert's killing by the New York World newspaper in 1924 earned it the Pulitzer Prize for Public Service. Governor Cary A. Hardee ended convict leasing in 1923, due in part to the Tabert case and the resulting publicity.

North Carolina, while without a system comparable to the other states, did not prohibit the practice until 1933. Alabama was the last to end the practice of official convict leasing in 1928 by the State, but many counties in the South continued the practice for years.

See also

Convict assignment (Australia)
Federal Prison Industries
Field holler
Field slaves in the United States
History of unfree labor in the United States
Penal labor in the United States
Ruiz v. Estelle
Slavery in the 21st century#Prison labor
Trusty system

References

Further reading
 Blackmon, Douglas A. Slavery by Another Name: The Re-Enslavement of Black Americans from the Civil War to World War II, New York: Anchor Books, Random House Publishing, 2008. .
 Kahn, Si, and Elizabeth Minnich. The Fox in the Henhouse: How Privatization Threatens Democracy, San Francisco: Berrett-Koehler Publishers, 2005. .
 Moulder, Rebecca, H. "Convicts as Capital: Thomas O'Conner and the Leases of the Tennessee Penitentiary System, 1871–1883", East Tennessee Historical Society Publications, no. 48 (1976): 58–59.
 Oshinsky, David M. Worse Than Slavery: Parchman Farm and the Ordeal of Jim Crow Justice. New York: The Free Press, 1996. .
 Blue, Ethan. "Doing Time in the Depression: Everyday Life in Texas and California Prison". New York: New York University Press, 2012. .
 
 Cardon, Nathan. "'Less Than Mayhem': Louisiana's Convict Lease, 1865-1901" Louisiana History: The Journal of the Louisiana History Association (Fall, 2017): 416-439.
 Shapiro, Karen. A New South Rebellion: The Battle Against Convict Labor in the Tennessee Coalfields, 1871-1896 (University of North Carolina Press, 1998).
 Lichtenstein, Alex. Twice the Work of Free Labor: The Political Economy of Convict Labor in the New South (Verso, 1996).

External links
  Powell, J.C., The American Siberia (1891), memoir of 14 years in a Florida convict camp; full text online at GoogleBooks
Waters, Robert. "Convict Leasing in Florida, or A Postcard from a Southern Siberia", June 2007, guest post at Laura James' CLEWS, a literary blog about crime
 Slavery by Another Name (2012)

1844 establishments in Louisiana
1941 disestablishments in the United States
African-American history between emancipation and the civil rights movement
Agricultural labor in the United States
Anti-black racism in the United States
History of African-American civil rights
Imprisonment and detention in the United States
Jim Crow
Labor history of the United States
Legal history of the United States
Penal labor in the United States
Race legislation in the United States
Reconstruction Era
Repealed United States legislation
White supremacy in the United States
History of the Southern United States